Janine Claire Ilitch (née Lynch; born 27 January 1972) is an Australian netball player. She was an Australian Institute of Sport scholarship holder in 1993.

Ilitch was born in Mordialloc, Victoria.  She has been a frequent member of the Australian national team, playing in her usual positions of goal keeper and goal defence, since being first selected in 1995. Ilitch has also been a key member of the Melbourne Kestrels in the Commonwealth Bank Trophy ever since the competition's founding in 1997, and served a stint as captain in 2004.

After years of playing second-fiddle to accomplished defenders Kathryn Harby-Williams and Liz Ellis, Ilitch finally cracked the Australian starting-seven in November 2004, where her combination with Australian captain Ellis played a major role in Australia's series victory against New Zealand. This combination was never to reach its true potential, when Ilitch took the 2005 season off due to being pregnant with her second child, and Ellis withdrew from the Australian team with a knee injury upon Ilitch's return. Ilitch won a place in Australia's silver-winning Commonwealth games team in 2006. After playing limited games with the Melbourne Kestrels in the 2006 Commonwealth Bank Trophy season, Ilitch announced her retirement.

References

1972 births
Living people
Melbourne Kestrels players
Netball players at the 1998 Commonwealth Games
Netball players at the 2002 Commonwealth Games
Netball players at the 2006 Commonwealth Games
Commonwealth Games gold medallists for Australia
Commonwealth Games silver medallists for Australia
Australian Institute of Sport netball players
Commonwealth Games medallists in netball
Australia international netball players
Melbourne Phoenix players
Monash University alumni
Netball players from Melbourne
Esso/Mobil Superleague players
1999 World Netball Championships players
2003 World Netball Championships players
20th-century Australian women
21st-century Australian women
People from Mordialloc, Victoria
Medallists at the 1998 Commonwealth Games
Medallists at the 2002 Commonwealth Games
Medallists at the 2006 Commonwealth Games